Behold Beatrice or Beatrice's Temptation (French: Béatrice devant le désir) is a 1944 French drama film directed by Jean de Marguenat and starring Fernand Ledoux, Jules Berry and Renée Faure. It features an early performance by the future star Simone Signoret.

It was shot at the Victorine Studios in the southern French city of Nice. The film's sets were designed by the art director Georges Wakhévitch.

Cast
 Fernand Ledoux as Le docteur Mauléon  
 Jules Berry as Richelière  
 Renée Faure as Béatrice  
 Gérard Landry as José  
 Thérèse Dorny as Tante Hermance  
 Jacques Berthier as Jacques Richelière 
 Marie Carlot as Paula
 Jean Barrère 
 Henry Bonvallet as Le docteur Lemonsquier 
 Mario Cazes as Le violoniste  
 Georges Gosset 
 Lucy Lancy as Gaby  
 Liliane Lonville 
 Emma Lyonel as Madame Dourthe 
 Jean-Jacques Lécot 
 Marfisa as La chanteuse  
 Marguerite Mayanne as Madame de Saint-Savin  
 Marcelle Naudia as La baronne  
 Suzy Pierson as Madame de Wallée  
 Robert Pizani as Alfred  
 Jacques Sablon 
 Maud Saintange 
 Simone Signoret as Liliane Moraccini 
 Georges Térof as Machonneau

References

Bibliography 
 Goble, Alan. The Complete Index to Literary Sources in Film. Walter de Gruyter, 1999.
 Hayward, Susan. Simone Signoret: The Star as Cultural Sign. A&C Black, 2004.

External links 
 

1944 films
French drama films
1944 drama films
1940s French-language films
Films directed by Jean de Marguenat
French black-and-white films
1940s French films